Spring Parade is a 1934 comedy film directed by Géza von Bolváry and starring Paul Hörbiger, Franciska Gaal, and Wolf Albach-Retty.

The film was made by the German subsidiary of Universal Pictures to whom Gaal was under contract. However the rise of the Nazi Party to power meant that Gaal and several other Jewish figures involved with the film had to work in Budapest and Vienna. The film's sets were designed by art director Emil Hasler.

In 1940 the film was remade in Hollywood as Spring Parade. The screenwriter Ernst Marischka and producer Joe Pasternak worked on both films.

Cast

References

Bibliography 
 Von Dassanowsky, Robert. Screening Transcendence: Film Under Austrofascism and the Hollywood Hope, 1933-1938. Indiana University Press, 2018

External links

Hungarian comedy films
1930s historical comedy films
Films directed by Géza von Bolváry
Films produced by Joe Pasternak
Films set in the 1890s
Films set in Vienna
Hungarian black-and-white films
Austrian black-and-white films
German black-and-white films
1934 comedy films
Films scored by Robert Stolz
German historical comedy films
Austrian historical comedy films
1930s German films